The 16th parallel south is a circle of latitude that is 16 degrees south of the Earth's equatorial plane. It crosses the Atlantic Ocean, Africa, the Indian Ocean, Australasia, the Pacific Ocean and South America.

A section of the border between Mozambique and Zimbabwe is defined by the parallel.

Around the world
Starting at the Prime Meridian and heading eastwards, the parallel 16° south passes through:

{| class="wikitable plainrowheaders"
! scope="col" width="125" | Co-ordinates
! scope="col" | Country, territory or sea
! scope="col" | Notes
|-
| style="background:#b0e0e6;" | 
! scope="row" style="background:#b0e0e6;" | Atlantic Ocean
| style="background:#b0e0e6;" |
|-
| 
! scope="row" | 
|
|-
| 
! scope="row" | 
|
|-
| 
! scope="row" | 
|
|-
| 
! scope="row" |  /  border
|
|-
| 
! scope="row" | 
| For about 20 km
|-
| 
! scope="row" | 
| For about 9 km
|-
| 
! scope="row" | 
|
|-
| 
! scope="row" | 
|
|-
| 
! scope="row" | 
|
|-
| style="background:#b0e0e6;" | 
! scope="row" style="background:#b0e0e6;" | Indian Ocean
| style="background:#b0e0e6;" | Mozambique Channel
|-
| 
! scope="row" | 
|
|-valign="top"
| style="background:#b0e0e6;" | 
! scope="row" style="background:#b0e0e6;" | Indian Ocean
| style="background:#b0e0e6;" | Passing just south of Tromelin Island,  Passing just north of Albatross Island, 
|-valign="top"
| 
! scope="row" | 
| Western Australia Northern Territory
|-
| style="background:#b0e0e6;" | 
! scope="row" style="background:#b0e0e6;" | Indian Ocean
| style="background:#b0e0e6;" | Gulf of Carpentaria
|-
| 
! scope="row" | 
| Queensland
|-valign="top"
| style="background:#b0e0e6;" | 
! scope="row" style="background:#b0e0e6;" | Pacific Ocean
| style="background:#b0e0e6;" | Passing through the Coral Sea Islands Territory, 
|-
| 
! scope="row" | 
| Island of Malakula
|-
| style="background:#b0e0e6;" | 
! scope="row" style="background:#b0e0e6;" | Pacific Ocean
| style="background:#b0e0e6;" | Coral Sea
|-
| 
! scope="row" | 
| Pentecost Island
|-valign="top"
| style="background:#b0e0e6;" | 
! scope="row" style="background:#b0e0e6;" | Pacific Ocean
| style="background:#b0e0e6;" | Passing just north of Vanua Levu island,  Passing just north of Qelelevu island,  Passing just south of Niuatoputapu island,  Passing just south of Motu One atoll,  Passing just north of Tupai atoll,  Passing just south of Makatea atoll,  Passing just south of Kaukura atoll,  Passing just north of Niau atoll, 
|-
| 
! scope="row" | 
| Passing through Toau atoll
|-valign="top"
| style="background:#b0e0e6;" | 
! scope="row" style="background:#b0e0e6;" | Pacific Ocean
| style="background:#b0e0e6;" | Passing just north of Fakarava atoll,  Passing just south of Kauehi atoll,  Passing just north of Raraka atoll, 
|-
| 
! scope="row" | 
| Passing through Raroia atoll
|-valign="top"
| style="background:#b0e0e6;" | 
! scope="row" style="background:#b0e0e6;" | Pacific Ocean
| style="background:#b0e0e6;" | Passing just south of Takume atoll,  Passing just south of Fangatau atoll, 
|-
| 
! scope="row" | 
| Passing through Fakahina atoll
|-
| style="background:#b0e0e6;" | 
! scope="row" style="background:#b0e0e6;" | Pacific Ocean
| style="background:#b0e0e6;" |
|-
| 
! scope="row" | 
| The border with Bolivia is in Lake Titicaca
|-
| 
! scope="row" | 
|
|-valign="top"
| 
! scope="row" | 
| Mato Grosso Goiás Federal District - passing just south of Brasília Goiás - for about 18 km Minas Gerais Bahia
|-
| style="background:#b0e0e6;" | 
! scope="row" style="background:#b0e0e6;" | Atlantic Ocean
| style="background:#b0e0e6;" |
|-valign="top"
| 
! scope="row" | 
| Island of Saint Helena
|-
| style="background:#b0e0e6;" | 
! scope="row" style="background:#b0e0e6;" | Atlantic Ocean
| style="background:#b0e0e6;" |
|-
|}

See also
15th parallel south
17th parallel south

s16
Mozambique–Zimbabwe border